The 1875 St Ives by-election was fought on 5 March 1875. The by-election was caused by the previous by-election being declared void on petition, on grounds of "general treating". It was retained by Conservative MP, Charles Praed.

References

1875 elections in the United Kingdom
1875 in England
March 1875 events
19th century in Cornwall
By-elections to the Parliament of the United Kingdom in Cornish constituencies
St Ives, Cornwall